What's Goin' On There? was a weekly live variety hour television program produced by RMITV that broadcast on C31 Melbourne. The show was a reboot of Under Melbourne Tonight but with quiz show elements. The show featured a combination of theatre sports, live bands, topical quizzes and sitcom sketches. The regular cast included Stephen Hall, Vin "Rastas" Hedger, Tony Biggs, Corrine Grant, Bernie Carr and Bambii Lush as the scorer for the quizzes. Special guests included Alan Brough, Rove McManus, Wil Anderson, Adam Richard, Dave Hughes, Dave O'Neil, Lawrence Mooney, Peter Helliar. The second reboot of Under Melbourne Tonight was called Whose Shout and aired in 1999.

Cast

References

Television shows set in Victoria (Australia)
Australian community access television shows
English-language television shows
1998 Australian television series debuts
1998 Australian television series endings
RMITV productions